The Taconic orogeny was a mountain building period that ended 440 million years ago and affected most of modern-day New England. A great mountain chain formed from eastern Canada down through what is now the Piedmont of the East coast of the United States. As the mountain chain eroded in the Silurian and Devonian periods, sediments from the mountain chain spread throughout the present-day Appalachians and midcontinental North America.

New England and Canada
Beginning in Cambrian time, about 550 million years ago, the Iapetus Ocean began to close. The weight of accumulating sediments, in addition to compressional forces in the crust, forced the eastern edge of the North American continent to fold gradually downward. In this manner, shallow-water carbonate deposition that had persisted on the continental shelf margin through Late Cambrian into Early Ordovician time, gave way to fine-grained clastic deposition and deeper water conditions during the Middle Ordovician. In this period a convergent plate boundary developed along the eastern edge of a small island chain. Crustal material beneath the Iapetus Ocean sank into the mantle along a subduction zone with an eastward-dipping orientation. Dewatering of the down-going plate led to hydration of the peridotites in the overlying mantle wedge, lowering their melting point. This led to partial melting of the peridotites within the mantle wedge producing magma that returned to the surface to form the offshore Taconic (or Bronson Hill) island arc.

By the Late Ordovician, this island arc had collided with the North American continent. The sedimentary and igneous rock between the land masses were intensely folded and faulted, and were subjected to varying degrees of intense metamorphism. This was the final episode of the Taconic Orogeny. Cameron's Line is the suture zone that is modern-day evidence of the collision of the island arc and the continent. Cameron's Line winds southward out of New England into Western Connecticut and passes through southern New York across the Bronx, following the general trend of the East River. It extends beneath sedimentary cover on Staten Island and southward beneath the Coastal Plain of New Jersey. In general, basement rocks to the west of Cameron's Line are regarded as autochthonous, meaning that they have not been significantly displaced by tectonic processes. The rocks to the west of Cameron's Line include metamorphosed sedimentary material originally comprising ancient continental slope, rise, and shelf deposits. The rocks to the east of Cameron's Line are allochthonous, which means they have been shoved westward over autochthonous basement rocks on the order of many tens or even hundreds of kilometers. These rocks were originally deposited as sediments in a deep water basin. Cameron's Line represents the trace of a subduction zone that ceased when the Taconic island arc collided with, and became accreted onto, the eastern margin of North America. Many of the rocks east of Cameron's Line were once part of the floor of the Iapetus Ocean.

When the Taconic Orogeny subsided during Late Ordovician time (about 440 million years ago), subduction ended, culminating in the accretion of the Iapetus Terrane onto the eastern margin of the continent. This resulted in the formation of a great mountain range throughout New England and eastern Canada, and perhaps to a lesser degree, southward along the region that is now the Piedmont of eastern North America.  The newly expanded continental margin gradually stabilized. Erosion continued to strip away sediments from upland areas. Inland seas covering the Midcontinent gradually expanded eastward into the New York Bight region and became the site of shallow clastic and carbonate deposition. This tectonically quiet period persisted until the Late Devonian time (about 360 million years ago) when the next period of mountain-building began, the Acadian orogeny.

Southern Appalachians
In the southern Appalachians of Alabama, Georgia, and North Carolina, the Taconic orogeny was not associated with collision of an island arc with ancient North America (Laurentia).  Geologists working in these areas have long puzzled over the "missing" arc terrane typical of Taconic-aged rocks in New England and Canada.  Instead, the Iapetus margin of this part of Laurentia appears to have faced a back-arc basin during the Ordovician, suggesting that Iapetus oceanic crust was subducted beneath Laurentia - unlike the New England and Canadian segments of the margin, where Laurentia was on the subducting plate.  In contrast to the Ordovician geologic history of New England, rocks in Alabama, Georgia, and North Carolina, including those of the Dahlonega gold belt (GA and NC), Talladega belt (Alabama and Georgia), and eastern Blue Ridge (AL, GA, and NC), are not typical of a volcanic arc in its strictest sense.  Instead, these rocks have geochemical and other characteristics typical of back-arc basins - which form behind the volcanic arc on the overriding plate.  The presence of these Early-Middle Ordovician (480 - 460 million year old) back-arc basin rocks in direct or faulted contact with rocks of the Laurentian shelf and slope-rise in the southern Appalachians suggest they were built on the margin of Laurentia, beyond the edge of the continental shelf-slope break.  In the southern Appalachians, the Ordovician Laurentian margin probably resembled that seen in the modern Sea of Japan, with the continental mainland separated from a volcanic arc by a narrow, "marginal" seaway.  Other lines of evidence supporting a back-arc, Sea of Japan-style tectonic model for the Taconic orogeny in the southern Appalachians include mixing of Ordovician and Grenville (ca. 1 billion year old) detrital zircons in metamorphosed sedimentary sequences, and interlayering of metamorphosed Ordovician volcanic rocks with sedimentary rocks derived from the Laurentian margin.

Relation with the Famatinian orogeny
It has been suggested that the coeval Famatinian orogeny in Western Gondwana (South America) is the "southward" continuation of the Taconic orogeny. This has been explained by adding that the continent Laurentia could have collided with Western Gondwana in early Paleozoic times due to the closure of the Iapetus Ocean. According to this view the Cuyania terrane would be an allochtonous block of Laurentian origin that was left in Gondwana. But such views are not unchallenged since Cuyania is alternatively suggested to have drifted across Iapetus Ocean as a microcontinent starting in Laurentia and accreting then to Gondwana. Further a third model claims Cuyania is para-autochthonous and arrived at its current place by strike-slip faults starting not from Laurentia but from Gondwana.

Aftermath 
As the Taconic Orogeny subsided in Early Silurian time, uplifts and folds in the Hudson Valley region were beveled by erosion. Upon this surface sediments began to accumulate, derived from remaining uplifts in the New England region. The evidence for this is the Silurian Shawangunk Conglomerate, a massive, ridge-forming quartz sandstone and conglomerate formation, which rests unconformably on a surface of older gently- to steeply-dipping pre-Silurian age strata throughout the region. This ridge of Shawangunk Conglomerate extends southward from the Hudson Valley along the eastern front of the Catskills. It forms the impressive caprock ridge of the Shawangunk Mountains west of New Paltz. To the south and west it becomes the prominent ridge-forming unit that crops out along the crest of Kittatinny Mountain in New Jersey.

Through Silurian time, the deposition of coarse alluvial sediments gave way to shallow marine fine-grained muds, and eventually to clear-water carbonate sediment accumulation with reefs formed from the accumulation of calcareous algae and the skeletal remains of coral, stromatoporoids, brachiopods, and other ancient marine fauna. The episodic eustatic rise and fall of sea level caused depositional environments to change or to shift laterally. As a result, the preserved faunal remains, and the character and composition of the sedimentary layers deposited in any particular location varied through time. The textural or compositional variations of the strata, as well as the changing fossil fauna preserved, are used to define the numerous sedimentary formations of Silurian through Devonian age preserved throughout the region.

See also
 Ebenezer Emmons, the geologist who first described the Taconic system
 Queenston Delta, a clastic wedge of sediment deposited west of the Taconics at that time

Notes

References 

Ordovician orogenies
Geology of New York (state)
Geology of New Jersey
Taconic Mountains